Herbert Hensley Henson (8 November 1863 – 27 September 1947) was an English Anglican bishop, scholar and controversialist. He was Bishop of Hereford from 1918 to 1920 and Bishop of Durham from 1920 to 1939.

The son of a zealous member of the Plymouth Brethren, Henson was not allowed to go to school until he was fourteen, and was largely self-educated. He was admitted to the University of Oxford, and gained a first-class degree in 1884. In the same year he was elected as a Fellow of All Souls, where he began to make a reputation as a speaker. He was ordained priest in 1888.

Feeling a vocation to minister to the urban poor, Henson served in the East End of London and Barking before becoming chaplain of an ancient hospice in Ilford in 1895. In 1900 he was appointed to the high-profile post of vicar of St Margaret's, Westminster, and canon of Westminster Abbey. While there, and as Dean of Durham (1913–18), he wrote prolifically and sometimes controversially. The Anglo-Catholic wing of the church took exception to his liberal theological views, which some regarded as heretical, and sought unsuccessfully in 1917 to block his appointment as Bishop of Hereford.

In 1920, after two years in the largely rural diocese of Hereford, Henson returned to Durham as its bishop. The industrial north-east of England, including County Durham, was badly affected by an economic depression. Henson was opposed to strikes, trade unions and socialism, and for a time his forthright expression of his views made him unpopular in the diocese. His opinions about some Church matters changed radically during his career: at first a strong advocate of the Church of England's continued establishment as the country's official church, he came to believe that politicians could not be trusted to legislate properly on ecclesiastical matters, and he espoused the cause of disestablishment. He campaigned against prohibition, the exploitation of foreign workers by British companies, and fascist and Nazi aggression. He supported – particularly prior to the 1936 Abdication Crisis – reform of the divorce laws, the controversial 1928 revision of the Book of Common Prayer, and ecumenism.

Life and career

Early years
Henson was born in London, the fourth son and sixth child of eight of Thomas Henson (1812–1896), a businessman, and his second wife, Martha, née Fear. The family moved to Broadstairs on the coast of Kent when Henson was two years old. Thomas Henson was a zealous evangelical Christian who had renounced the Church of England and joined the Plymouth Brethren. Martha Henson shielded her children from the worst excesses of what the biographer Matthew Grimley describes as Thomas's "bigotry", but in 1870 she died, and, in Henson's words, "with her died our happiness". From an early age the young Henson was a dedicated Christian and felt a vocation for the Anglican priesthood; his father's fundamentalist views were anathema, and left him with what Grimley calls "an enduring hatred of protestant fanaticism". In 1873 Thomas Henson remarried; Emma Parker, widow of a Lutheran pastor, filled the role of stepmother with sympathy and kindness, mitigating the father's grimness and ensuring that the children were properly educated. In Henson's phrase, "she recreated the home".

Henson was fourteen before his father allowed him either to be baptised or to attend a school. The Rector of Broadstairs conducted the baptism; there were no godparents, and Henson undertook their functions himself. He took religious instruction from the rector leading to his confirmation as a communicant member of the Church of England in 1878. At Broadstairs Collegiate School he derived little educational benefit, having already educated himself widely and deeply from books in his father's library. He rose to be head boy of the school, but after a dispute with the headmaster during which Henson expressed "with more passion than respect" his opinion of the head, he ran away from the school in 1879. He gained employment as an assistant master at Brigg Grammar School in Lincolnshire; the headmaster there recognised his talent and recommended that he should apply for admission to the University of Oxford. Thomas Henson was against the idea, partly because his financial means had declined, but was talked round by his wife and gave his consent. Thomas agreed to fund his son's studies, but the sum he allowed was too little to pay the substantial fees for residence at any of the colleges of the university. In 1881 Henson applied successfully for admission as an unattached student, a member of none of the Oxford colleges, but eligible for the full range of university tuition. Cut off from the camaraderie of college life, Henson felt seriously isolated. He concentrated on his studies, and gained a first class honours degree in Modern History in June 1884.

All Souls

Such was the quality of Henson's scholarship that his history tutor encouraged him to enter the annual competition for appointment as a Fellow of All Souls, the university's post-graduate research college. He was appointed in November 1884, at the age of twenty. Membership of the college offered an annual stipend of £200; for the first time, Henson was in reasonably comfortable financial circumstances. At All Souls, he later wrote, "I was welcomed with a generous kindness which made me feel immediately at home. I formed friendships which have enriched my life." His biographer John Peart-Binns suggests that Henson may nonetheless have remained something of an outsider, his arrival at All Souls "akin to that of an alien". The college was headed by the Warden, Sir William Anson, who became something of a father figure to Henson, and encouraged his researches. Henson's first paper, on William II of England, marked him out as not only a fine scholar but a gripping speaker when he delivered it to an audience. Aware that his quick tongue could lead him into indiscretion, he adopted and maintained all his life the practice of writing out his lectures and sermons in full beforehand rather than improvising or speaking from concise notes. He preferred a quill pen, and wrote in a fine clear hand; he considered illegible writing to be a form of bad manners as tiresome as inaudible talking. He gained a reputation as a controversialist. In a biographical sketch, Harold Begbie wrote that at Oxford Henson was nicknamed "Coxley Cocksure"; he added:

In 1885, in tandem with his work at All Souls, Henson acted as tutor to Lyle Rathbone, son of the philanthropic businessman William Rathbone. The family lived in Birkenhead, where for six months Henson stayed with them. He had ample leisure time, much of which he spent in visiting local churches and nonconformist chapels. This process left him struggling with doctrinal questions, but sure of a religious vocation. The day after his return to Oxford in October 1885 he went into St Mary's, Iffley, and with his hand on the altar vowed to dedicate himself to God and the Church.

Henson's beliefs on doctrine were still forming, but he inclined to high-churchmanship and was influenced by Charles Gore and the Puseyites, though he was unattracted by more extreme Anglo-Catholic forms of ritualism. With his suspicion of nonconformism he was a proponent of the principle of establishment – the maintenance of Anglicanism as the official state religion – and in 1886 he became secretary of the new Oxford Laymen's League for Defence of the National Church, to counter the threat of disestablishment proposed by politicians such as Joseph Chamberlain and Charles Dilke.

Ordination and east London
The poverty Henson had seen during his six months in Birkenhead gave him a strong impetus to minister to the poor. In 1887, after being ordained deacon, he took charge of the Oxford House Settlement, a high-church mission in Bethnal Green, a poor area of the East End of London. While in this post he honed his speaking skills in public debates with atheist orators, many from the National Secular Society's Bethnal Green office.

In 1888 Henson was ordained priest. Shortly afterwards All Souls appointed him vicar of a church in its gift: St Margaret's, Barking, in east London, a large, working class parish, with a population of 12,000, and increasing. At twenty-five he was the youngest vicar in the country, and had a large staff of curates to manage. An All Souls colleague Cosmo Lang, himself on the brink of a Church career, visited Henson at Barking and noted, "He came six months ago to a parish dead – 250 a good congregation in the church; and now, when he preaches, every seat is filled – 1100!"

With the energy and impetuosity noted by Lang, Henson worked continually over the next seven years to improve the parish, restoring the fabric of the church, opening clubs for his parishioners, and holding popular open-air services in the vicarage grounds. At Barking his high-church leanings were welcomed, and he was invited to preach from time to time at St Alban's Holborn, a central London bastion of Anglo-Catholicism. He was never physically strong, and his relentless work at Barking put a strain on his physique. In 1895 he accepted an offer from Lord Salisbury of a less arduous post, the chaplaincy of St Mary's Hospital, Ilford, which he held until 1900. In 1895 and 1896, Henson was select preacher at Oxford, and from 1897 he served as chaplain to John Festing, Bishop of St Albans. He had time for writing; between 1897 and 1900 he published four books, ranging from purely theological studies to analyses of Church politics. His beliefs had changed from his early high-churchmanship to a broad-church latitudinarianism; his 1899 Cui bono? set out his concerns about the strict ritualists in the Anglo-Catholic wing of the church.

Westminster

The Ilford appointment had been in Salisbury's personal gift; in his official capacity as prime minister he was responsible for Henson's next appointment: rector of St Margaret's, Westminster and canon of Westminster Abbey in 1900. St Margaret's, the parish church of the British parliament, was a high-profile appointment; Henson followed predecessors as willing as he was to court controversy including Henry Hart Milman and Frederic Farrar. His eventual successor as Bishop of Durham, Alwyn Williams wrote that at St Margaret's, Henson's brilliance as a speaker and independence of thought attracted large congregations and "his increasingly liberal churchmanship" appealed to a wide range of public opinion, though some of his views offended the orthodox.

In October 1902 at Westminster Abbey Henson married Isabella (Ella) Caroline (1870–1949), the only daughter of James Wallis Dennistoun of Dennistoun, Scotland. Grimley comments that it was in keeping with Henson's usual impulsiveness that he proposed within four days of meeting her. The marriage was lifelong; there were no children.

From his pulpit, Henson spoke against the view that ecumenism was, in W E Gladstone's words, "a moral monster", and criticised schools that failed to provide adequate religious instruction. Preaching at Westminster Abbey in 1912 he attracted international attention for naming and denouncing three British directors of the Peruvian-Amazon Company for the "Putumayo atrocities" – the mass enslavement and brutal treatment of indigenous Peruvians in the company's rubber factories. During his time at St Margaret's Henson published nine books, some of them collected sermons and lectures, others on the role of Christianity in modern society and theological questions.

Henson's uncompromising character brought him into frequent conflict with old friends and colleagues. In 1909 he offended Charles Gore, now Bishop of Birmingham, by defying Gore's order not to preach in the institute of a Congregational church in the diocese. His confrontational style and liberal theology caused delay in his promotion, despite his obvious abilities. An apocryphal story circulated in 1908 that the prime minister, H. H. Asquith, suggested Henson's name to Edward VII when the see of York became vacant, and the king replied, "Damn it all, man, I am Defender of the Faith!" In 1910 the post of Dean of Lincoln fell vacant. Asquith considered appointing Henson, but decided, as he told the Archbishop of Canterbury, Randall Davidson, that "it would be rather like sending a destroyer into a land-locked pool".

Dean and bishop

In 1912 the Dean of Durham, George Kitchin, died.  The Bishop, Handley Moule, hoped the prime minister would appoint Henry Watkins, the Archdeacon of Durham, but Asquith chose Henson. On 2 January 1913 Moule presided over Henson's formal installation at Durham Cathedral.

The five years Henson spent as Dean of Durham were marked by further controversy, including his objection to the existing divorce laws as too favourable to men and unfair to women. He was hostile to changes aimed at giving the church more control over its own affairs; he regarded establishment and parliamentary control as safeguards against extremism. He opposed William Temple's "Life and Liberty movement", which campaigned for synodical and democratic government of the church, and he was against the establishment of the National Assembly of the Church of England in 1919. To Henson, the essence of Anglicanism rested on parliamentary enforcement of the rights of the laity of the church against the bishops and priests, and the inclusion of both clergy and laity in all matters under the rule of the monarch as Supreme Governor of the church.

Among other views for which Henson was known were his disapproval of teetotalism campaigners and of socialism, and for his disbelief in social reform as an ally of religion. When the Kikuyu controversy erupted in 1913 Henson once again found himself at odds with Gore. The question was whether two colonial bishops had committed heresy by taking part in an ecumenical service. Gore and his ally Bishop Weston of Zanzibar led the charge, and appear in Henson's journal as "devoted, unselfish, indefatigable, eminently gifted, but ... also fanatical in temper, bigoted in their beliefs, and reckless in their methods." Together with Bishop Moule, Dean Wace of Canterbury and other leaders, Henson strongly, and successfully, supported the accused bishops: "The Church owes a deep debt of gratitude to the Bishops of Uganda and Mombasa."

Henson spoke out strongly, and ultimately unsuccessfully, against the proposed disestablishment of the Anglican Church in Wales. In doing so he addressed many nonconformist gatherings; the historian Owen Chadwick suggests that this may have commended him to David Lloyd George, who became prime minister in 1916. A serious doctrinal row within the church seemed to many to put Henson out of the running for elevation to a bishopric. He had defended the right of clergy to express doubts about the virgin birth and bodily resurrection. He was, as most of his critics failed, or refused, to notice, doctrinally orthodox on the resurrection, and content to accept the tradition of the virgin birth, but his contention that other priests had the right to question them was intolerable to the Anglo-Catholic wing of the church, led by Gore.

Archbishop Randall Davidson had no doubts about Henson's doctrinal soundness, and persuaded him to issue a statement of faith to silence his critics. Davidson stated publicly that no fair-minded man could read consecutively a series of Henson's sermons without feeling that they had in him a brilliant and powerful teacher of the Christian faith. Gore and his followers were obliged to call off their protests. Against Davidson's advice for caution, Lloyd George appointed Henson to the vacant see of Hereford in 1917. Gore and others, including Cosmo Lang, now the Archbishop of York, failed to attend the consecration service. Their attitude hurt Henson, offended lay opinion in the church, and was sharply criticised in The Times. Henson was consecrated bishop in Westminster Abbey on 4 February 1918 by Davidson, assisted by twelve supporting bishops. He was enthroned at Hereford Cathedral eight days later.

Although Henson's elevation was controversial chiefly among factions of the clergy – in general lay people supported his appointment – it nevertheless gave fresh impetus to the idea of taking away from the prime minister the power to choose bishops. Gore attempted to promote the idea at the Convocation of Clergy in May 1918; Henson abandoned restraint and in Chadwick's words "stripped Gore's arguments bare". He argued from historical examples that appointments made at the church's instigation were partisan and disastrous, and that the Crown and prime minister were able to take an unbiased view in the national interest. Despite the public support for him, the controversy revived Henson's feelings of isolation.

The appointment was described as "sending an armoured car into an orchard of apple trees" and Henson had doubts about accepting a mainly rural diocese rather than ministering to the urban poor. Nevertheless, the clergy and laity of Hereford gave him a warm welcome, and he enjoyed working with the incumbents of country parishes. They appreciated his delicacy in not intruding unduly into local church concerns, and it was remarked that "he treated all the world as his equals". During his brief time at Hereford he published only one book, Christian Liberty (1918), a collection of sermons.

Henson was an active Freemason. At Hereford, he and the dean, Reginald Waterfield, were among the founders of a new masonic lodge in 1920.  Peart-Binns describes him as enjoying the meetings of his various lodges, but finding the associated social activities "intolerable". Henson was outspoken as an apologist for Freemasonry, promoting its ideals, and its religious foundations.

There was regret in the diocese that Henson's tenure there was brief. In 1920 the see of Durham became vacant on the death of Bishop Moule. Davidson wanted Thomas Strong, Dean of Christ Church, to be appointed and pressed his claims on Lloyd George, but the prime minister took the view that the area needed Henson's practical skills and common touch rather than Strong's academic scholarship.

Durham
Henson was translated to Durham – England's most senior diocese after Canterbury, York and London – in October 1920. The appointment was challenging: the area was in grave economic difficulty, with the important coal-mining industry in a crisis caused by falling industrial demand for coal in the years after the war. Ecclesiastically there was potential for friction, as the Dean of Durham, James Welldon, who had once been a bishop himself, was temperamentally and politically at odds with his new superior, given to making public statements that Henson found infuriating. Welldon, in Henson's view,  "could neither speak with effect nor be silent with dignity". They clashed on several occasions, most conspicuously when Welldon, a strong admirer of prohibition, publicly criticised Henson's tolerant views on the consumption of alcohol. Relations between the Deanery and Auckland Castle, the bishop's official residence, improved markedly in April 1933 when Cyril Alington, the Head Master of Eton from 1917 to 1933, succeeded Welldon. Alington was almost universally loved, and though he and Henson differed on points of ecclesiastical practice, they remained warm friends.

At the beginning of Henson's episcopate the Durham miners were on strike. He got on well with miners individually and conversed with many of them as they walked through the extensive grounds of Auckland Castle. It was said of him that he got on easily with everyone "except other dignitaries in gaiters".  Friction arose from Henson's belief that strikes were morally wrong because of the harm they did to other working people, and he had, in Grimley's words, "a violent, almost obsessional", dislike of trade unions. His early concern for the welfare of the poor remained unchanged, but he regarded socialism and trade unionism as negations of individuality. For the same reason he was against state provision of social welfare, though a strong advocate of voluntary spending on it. Later in his bishopric Henson denounced the Jarrow March in 1936 as "revolutionary mob pressure" and condemned the action of his subordinate, the suffragan Bishop of Jarrow, who had given the march his blessing. He loathed class distinction, and was not antipathetic to social reformers, but he was strong in his criticism of Christian campaigners who maintained that the first duty of the church was social reform. To Henson, the church's principal concern was each individual man or woman's spiritual welfare.

The best-known anecdote of Henson, according to Chadwick, comes from his time at Durham. Cosmo Lang complained that his portrait by Orpen "makes me look proud, pompous and prelatical", to which Henson responded, "And to which of those epithets does your Grace take exception?" Grimley remarks that on occasion each of those unflattering adjectives applied just as much to Henson. Nonetheless, Henson ranked Lang "among the greater figures of ecclesiastical history".

The most conspicuous cause with which Henson was involved during his time at Durham was, in Anglican terms, of national—and even international—rather than diocesan concern. As a broad churchman he gave strong support in the mid-1920s to the major revision and modernising of the Book of Common Prayer, the Church of England's liturgical book that had been largely unchanged since 1662, in its proposed 1927 and 1928 editions. The evangelical wing of the church opposed the revision, which some low-church factions dubbed "popish". Henson, now on the same side as the Anglo-Catholics with whom he had early been in bitter dispute, called the opposition "the Protestant underworld". Despite the clear majority of clergy and laity in favour of the revision, the House of Commons refused to authorise it, and voted it down in 1927 and again in 1928. Henson's colleague Cyril Garbett wrote that the Commons had "made it plain that the Church does not possess full spiritual freedom to determine its worship". The church instituted damage limitation measures by permitting parishes to use the new unauthorised text where there was a local consensus to do so, but Henson was horrified at what he saw as Parliament's betrayal of its duty to preside impartially over the governance of the church, giving in to pressure from what he termed "an army of illiterates".

Together with the suspicions he had started to harbour that a socialist government might misuse ecclesiastical patronage, the Prayer Book debacle turned Henson from a strong proponent of establishment to its best-known critic.  He spent much time and energy fruitlessly campaigning for disestablishment. He was, as he had often been earlier in his career, an isolated figure. Few of his colleagues agreed with him, even those dismayed by the parliamentary vote. 

Hensley was less isolated in some other causes he took up in the 1920s and 30s. He was one of many wary of the ultra-liberalism of the Modern Churchmen's Union. In 1934, he was among the senior clerics who censured Dean Dwelly for inviting a Unitarian to preach in Liverpool Cathedral and Bishop David for permitting it.  He was critical of American evangelism as practised by Frank Buchman and the Oxford Group. Henson wrote of Buchman's "oracular despotism" and "the trail of moral and intellectual wrecks which its progress leaves behind." Henson was critical of one of his clergy, Robert Anderson Jardine of Darlington, for conducting the wedding ceremony in France of the Duke of Windsor to a divorced woman, contrary to the doctrine of the church. Henson was in a minority of senior clergy in speaking out against the dictators of the Axis powers. He condemned Nazi anti-Semitism, Mussolini's invasion of Abyssinia, appeasement and the Munich agreement.

On 1 February 1939, at the age of seventy-five, he retired from Durham to Hintlesham in Suffolk. Seven months later the Second World War began.  Henson supported the Allies' fight in what he saw as a just war to defeat godless barbarism; he wrote of "The deepening infamies of Nazi warfare – infamies so horrible as almost to shake one's faith in the essential Divineness of Humanity." He urged, "there can be no compromise or patched up peace".

Last years
Winston Churchill was impressed by Henson. Grimley comments that they had much in common, both spending years as isolated figures speaking out for beliefs that were dismissed at the time and later vindicated. As prime minister, Churchill persuaded Henson out of retirement in 1940 to resume his old duties as a Canon of Westminster Abbey. After overcoming the momentary strangeness of being back in his old post after nearly thirty years he preached with vigour until cataracts made his eyesight too poor to continue. He retired from the Abbey in 1941.

In his later years Henson's lifelong sense of loneliness was compounded by the growing deafness of his wife, making their conversation difficult. He found some solace in the friendship of her companion, Fearne Booker, who lived with the Hensons for more than thirty years. He occupied a considerable part of his retirement writing a substantial work of autobiography, published in three volumes under the title Retrospect of an Unimportant Life. Both at the time and subsequently many of his friends and admirers regretted his publishing the work; they thought he had done his reputation a disservice. Despite what Williams calls the "peculiar interest and vivacity" of the books, his survey of his many campaigns and controversies, seemed to others to be self-justifying and wilfully to deny many changes of stance that he had manifestly made during his career. In Williams's view the posthumous publication of Henson's edited letters were a better legacy: "delightful in both form and content, and, barbed though they often are, they do him fuller justice". He was offered the masonic position of Provincial Grand Master in his retirement, but declined it, believing himself too old.

In his writings Henson referred to his two regrets in life. The first was that he had not been at a public (i.e. fee-charging non-state) school, a fact to which he ascribed his lifelong feeling of being an outsider. The second regret was that he and his wife had been unable to have children. They unofficially adopted a succession of poor boys and paid for their education. At least one of them became a priest and was ordained by Henson.

Henson died at Hintlesham on 27 September 1947 at the age of eighty-four. At his wish his body was cremated; his ashes were interred in Durham Cathedral.

Bibliography

As editor

As author

 
 
 
 
 
 
 
 
 
  reissued 2010

Notes

References

Footnotes

Sources
 
 
 
 
 
 
 
 
 
 
 
 
 
 

1863 births
1947 deaths
20th-century Church of England bishops
Bishops of Durham
Bishops of Hereford
Canons of Westminster
Church of England deans
Deans of Durham
Fellows of All Souls College, Oxford
Alumni of the University of Oxford
Abdication of Edward VIII
Surtees Society